Martin Mortensen (born 5 November 1984 in Herning, Denmark) is a Danish former professional racing cyclist, who rode professionally from 2007 to 2019.

Major results

2000
 3rd Time trial, National Junior Road Championships
2002
 1st  Time trial, National Junior Road Championships
2004
 3rd Road race, National Under-23 Road Championships
2005
 National Under-23 Road Championships
1st  Time trial
2nd Road race
 4th Time trial, UCI Under-23 Road World Championships
 4th GP des Eaux Minérales de Beckerich
2006
 2nd Time trial, National Under-23 Road Championships
 5th Paris–Roubaix Espoirs
 10th La Côte Picarde
2007
 1st GP de Dourges-Hénin-Beaumont
 2nd Grand Prix de la ville de Nogent-sur-Oise
 4th Duo Normand (with Thomas Guldhammer)
 6th Overall Ronde de l'Oise
 10th Chrono Champenois
2008
 1st Duo Normand (with Michael Tronborg)
 3rd Overall Boucle de l'Artois
1st Stage 1
 4th Time trial, National Road Championships
 5th Chrono Champenois
2010
 2nd GP Herning
 National Road Championships
4th Road race
4th Time trial
 4th Overall Danmark Rundt
2011
 2nd Road race, National Road Championships
2013
 Tour de Normandie
1st  Mountains classification
1st Stage 2
 1st  Mountains classification Danmark Rundt
 1st Stage 4 Okolo Slovenska
 2nd GP Herning
 2nd Destination Thy
 2nd Ronde van Overijssel
 8th Overall Tour of Estonia
2014
 1st  Overall Czech Cycling Tour
1st Stage 2
 5th Road race, National Road Championships
2015
 1st Velothon Wales
 2nd Road race, National Road Championships
2016
 1st Tro-Bro Léon
2017
 5th Skive–Løbet
 8th GP Horsens
2018
 3rd Gooikse Pijl
 7th Scandinavian Race Uppsala

References

External links

1984 births
Living people
Danish male cyclists
People from Herning Municipality
Sportspeople from the Central Denmark Region